Zsolt Richly (March 23, 1941 – 24 January 2020) was a Hungarian animator who worked as a director in PannóniaFilm.  He was born in Sopron. His credits include the production of the Kockásfülű nyúl children's series.

Director
 Indiában (1966)
 Szvit (1968)
 A páva (1969) 
 Medvetánc (1971)
 Molnár Anna (1972)
 A hétpöttyös autó (1973)
 A kecske és a kos (1974)
 A kockásfülű nyúl (1977)
 Háry János (1983)
 Kíváncsi Fáncsi (1984)
 Fabulák (1985)
 Este a székelyeknél (1998)
 Hommage á Vajda Lajos (1999)
 Árgyélus királyfi (2003)
 A hetvenkedő sün (2004)
 A kevély kiskakas (2006)
 Kőműves Kelemen (2009)

External links

Hungarian animators
1941 births
2020 deaths
Hungarian animated film directors